Nathan Henry Bass Sr. (October 1, 1808 – September 22, 1890) was a prominent Confederate politician. He was born in Putnam County, Georgia. He represented the state in the Provisional Confederate Congress from January 14, 1862, to February 17, 1862, replacing Eugenius Aristides Nisbet who had resigned.

External links
 Political Graveyard bio

1808 births
1890 deaths
People from Putnam County, Georgia
People of Georgia (U.S. state) in the American Civil War
Deputies and delegates to the Provisional Congress of the Confederate States
19th-century American politicians